Ibrahim Maharram oglu Eminov ( / , ; 18 May 1963 - 2 July 2019) was an Azerbaijani musician and composer, co-founder of the bands "Yukhu" and "Sirr".

Biography 
Ibrahim Emin was born on 18 May 1963 in Sumgayit. In 1970, he started the school № 17 in Sumgayit. He served in the military in 1981-1983. In addition to his musical career, Ibrahim was also involved in painting. He died of esophageal cancer on 2 July 2019.

Career

Yukhu 

Ibrahim Emin could play the guitar since his childhood. He started his musical career in the early 1980s. He formed the group "Yukhu" in 1988. In addition to writing the lyrics and composing music of the songs performed by the group, he also played bass guitar in the band. In 1989, Yuxu won the music festival called "Golden Autumn" with the song "Xəzərin Sahilində". After a while, French manager Pascal invited to perform in France. At that time, it was not possible to go directly to France, so they decided to go through Turkey. However, due to unknown reasons, they were unable to travel to France and had to stay and perform in Turkey. Shortly after performing in Turkey, the group began to be recognized. He released three albums in Turkey: "Xəzərin Sahilində" (1993), "Sumgayit" (1994), "Ölümə çarə yox" (2001). Earthquake occurred in Turkey caused stagnation in the music sector. As a result, the band "Yukhu" could not perform for a long time, and the members of the group began to engage in different activities.

Sirr 
Later, Ibrahim Emin returned to Baku in 2003 and formed the band "Sirr" in Sumgayit in 2004. The album called "Yoruldum" was released by the group in 2014.

Quotations 
"As teenagers, we listened to Deep Purple and Led Zeppelin on BBC radio, and then they became a school for us. We were inspired by their music, and we started playing rock. Then, we formed our group. We recorded the song "Xəzərin Sahilində". The lyrics belonged to my father, I changed some words and we sang the song. A year later, we won the music festival called "Golden Autumn" with this song, and it all started with that."

"Those who know me well are aware of that I always say I will never change rock. I feel rock, rock is the music of freedom, rebellion. It is my music."

See also 
 Yukhu (band)

References

1963 births
2019 deaths
Rock bass guitarists
Azerbaijani rock musicians
Hard rock musicians
Heavy metal bass guitarists
Blues rock musicians
People from Sumgait